International taxation is the study or determination of tax on a person or business subject to the tax laws of different countries, or the international aspects of an individual country's tax laws as the case may be. Governments usually limit the scope of their income taxation in some manner territorially or provide for offsets to taxation relating to extraterritorial income. The manner of limitation generally takes the form of a territorial, residence-based, or exclusionary system.  Some governments have attempted to mitigate the differing limitations of each of these three broad systems by enacting a hybrid system with characteristics of two or more.

Many governments tax individuals and/or enterprises on income. Such systems of taxation vary widely, and there are no broad general rules.  These variations create the potential for double taxation (where the same income is taxed by different countries) and no taxation (where income is not taxed by any country). Income tax systems may impose tax on local income only or on worldwide income. Generally, where worldwide income is taxed, reductions of tax or foreign credits are provided for taxes paid to other jurisdictions. Limits are almost universally imposed on such credits.  Multinational corporations usually employ international tax specialists, a specialty among both lawyers and accountants, to decrease their worldwide tax liabilities.

With any system of taxation, it is possible to shift or recharacterize income in a manner that reduces taxation. Jurisdictions often impose rules relating to shifting income among commonly controlled parties, often referred to as transfer pricing rules. Residency-based systems are subject to taxpayer attempts to defer recognition of income through use of related parties. A few jurisdictions impose rules limiting such deferral ("anti-deferral" regimes). Deferral is also specifically authorized by some governments for particular social purposes or other grounds.  Agreements among governments (treaties) often attempt to determine who should be entitled to tax what. Most tax treaties provide for at least a skeleton mechanism for resolution of disputes between the parties.

Introduction
Systems of taxation vary among governments, making generalization difficult. Specifics are intended as examples, and relate to particular governments and not broadly recognized multinational rules. Taxes may be levied on varying measures of income, including but not limited to net income under local accounting concepts (in many countries this is referred to as 'profit'), gross receipts, gross margins (sales less costs of sale), or specific categories of receipts less specific categories of reductions. Unless otherwise specified, the term "income" should be read broadly.

Jurisdictions often impose different income-based levies on enterprises than on individuals. Entities are often taxed in a unified manner on all types of income while individuals are taxed in differing manners depending on the nature or source of the income. Many jurisdictions impose tax at both an entity level and at the owner level on one or more types of enterprises. These jurisdictions often rely on the company law of that jurisdiction or other jurisdictions in determining whether an entity's owners are to be taxed directly on the entity income. However, there are notable exceptions, including U.S. rules characterizing entities independently of legal form.

In order to simplify administration or for other agendas, some governments have imposed "deemed" income regimes. These regimes tax some class of taxpayers according to tax system applicable to other taxpayers but based on a deemed level of income, as if received by the taxpayer.  Disputes can arise regarding what levy is proper. Procedures for dispute resolution vary widely and enforcement issues are far more complicated in the international arena. The ultimate dispute resolution for a taxpayer is to leave the jurisdiction, taking all property that could be seized. For governments, the ultimate resolution may be confiscation of property, incarceration or dissolution of the entity.

Other major conceptual differences can exist between tax systems. These include, but are not limited to, assessment vs. self-assessment means of determining and collecting tax; methods of imposing sanctions for violation; sanctions unique to international aspects of the system; mechanisms for enforcement and collection of tax; and reporting mechanisms.

Taxation systems

Countries that tax income generally use one of two systems: territorial or residence-based. In the territorial system, only local income – income from a source inside the country – is taxed. In the residence-based system, residents of the country are taxed on their worldwide (local and foreign) income, while nonresidents are taxed only on their local income. In addition, a small number of countries also tax the worldwide income of their nonresident citizens in some cases.

Countries with a residence-based system of taxation usually allow deductions or credits for the tax that residents already pay to other countries on their foreign income. Many countries also sign tax treaties with each other to eliminate or reduce double taxation. In the case of corporate income tax, some countries allow an exclusion or deferment of specific items of foreign income from the base of taxation.

Individuals
The following table summarizes the taxation of local and foreign income of individuals, depending on their residence or citizenship in the country. It includes 244 entries: 194 sovereign countries, their 40 inhabited dependent territories (most of which have separate tax systems), and 10 countries with limited recognition. In the table, income includes any type of income received by individuals, such as work or investment income, and yes means that the country taxes at least one of these types.

Residency
Taxing regimes are generally classified as either residence-based or territorial. Most jurisdictions tax income on a residency basis. They need to define "resident" and characterize the income of nonresidents. Such definitions vary by country and type of taxpayer, but usually involve the location of the person's main home and number of days the person is physically present in the country. Examples include:

The United States taxes its citizens as residents, and provides lengthy, detailed rules for individual residency of foreigners, covering:
periods establishing residency (including a formulary calculation involving three years);
start and end date of residency;
exceptions for transitory visits, medical conditions, etc.
The United Kingdom, prior to 2013, established three categories: non-resident, resident, and resident but not ordinarily resident. From 2013, the categories of resident are limited to non-resident and resident. Residency is established by application of the  tests in the Statutory Residency Test. 
Switzerland residency may be established by having a permit to be employed in Switzerland for an individual who is so employed.

Territorial systems usually tax local income regardless of the residence of the taxpayer. The key problem argued for this type of system is the ability to avoid taxation on portable income by moving it outside of the country. This has led governments to enact hybrid systems to recover lost revenue.

Citizenship
In the vast majority of countries, citizenship is completely irrelevant for taxation. Very few countries tax the foreign income of nonresident citizens in general:

 taxes the foreign income of its nonresident citizens at a reduced flat rate of 2% (income tax rates for local income are progressive from 2 to 30%). It has been reported that Eritrea enforces this tax on its citizens abroad through denial of passports, denial of entry or exit from the country, confiscation of assets in Eritrea, and even harassment of relatives living in Eritrea, until the tax is paid. In 2011, the United Nations Security Council passed a resolution condemning the collection of the Eritrean 'diaspora tax'. The governments of Canada and the Netherlands expelled Eritrean diplomats in 2013 and 2018, respectively, for collecting the tax. The parliaments of Sweden and the European Union have also expressed their intention to prohibit the practice there.

 considers all of its nonresident citizens as tax residents, except those who hold another nationality. However, it does not tax the foreign income of those who reside in countries that have tax treaties with Hungary. Nonresident citizens who do not satisfy these exceptions are taxed in the same manner as residents, at a flat rate of 15% on worldwide income, in addition to mandatory contributions of up to 18.5% on certain types of income. There is no minimum allowance or its equivalent in Hungary, meaning that all income is taxed. In this respect, Hungary is unique in Europe.

 taxes the foreign income, except salaries, of its nonresident citizens, at a reduced flat rate of 10% (general tax rates for residents are progressive from 5 to 25%).

 considers all of its citizens as residents for tax purposes, and taxes the worldwide income of its residents. However, it may not tax the foreign income of those who reside in countries that have tax treaties with Tajikistan.

 taxes the worldwide income of its nonresident citizens using the same tax rates as for residents. To mitigate double taxation, nonresident citizens may exclude some of their foreign income from work from U.S. taxation and take credit for income tax paid to other countries, and those residing in some countries with tax treaties may also exclude a few types of foreign income from U.S. taxation, but they must still file a U.S. tax return to claim the exclusion or credit even if they result in no tax liability. U.S. citizens abroad, like U.S. residents, are defined as "U.S. persons" and thus are also subject to various reporting requirements regarding foreign finances, such as FBAR, FATCA, and IRS forms 3520, 5471, 8621 and 8938. The penalties for failure to file these forms on time are often much higher than the penalties for not paying the tax itself.
Like Eritrea, enforcement tactics used by the U.S. government to facilitate tax compliance include the denial of U.S. passports to nonresident U.S. citizens deemed to be delinquent taxpayers and the potential seizure of any U.S. accounts and/or U.S.-based assets. The IRS can also exert substantial compliance pressure on nonresident citizens as a result of the FATCA legislation passed in 2010, which compels foreign banks to disclose U.S. account holders or face crippling fines on U.S.-related financial transactions. Unlike Eritrea, the U.S. has faced little international backlash related to its global enforcement tactics. For example, unlike their response to Eritrea's collection efforts, Canada and all EU member states have ratified intergovernmental agreements (IGAs) facilitating FATCA compliance and supporting the U.S. global tax regime in place for U.S. citizens (including dual nationals). The implementation of these IGAs has led to a substantial increase in U.S. citizenship renunciations since 2012, with wait times for renunciation appointments at the U.S. consulate in Toronto exceeding one year in early 2016.

A few countries tax based on citizenship only in limited situations:

 continues taxing its citizens who move from Finland to another country as residents of Finland, for the first three years after moving there, unless they demonstrate that they no longer have any ties to Finland. After this period, they are no longer considered residents of Finland for tax purposes.

 taxes its citizens who move to Monaco as residents of France, according to a treaty signed between the two countries in 1963. However, those who already lived in Monaco since 1957, as well as those who were born in Monaco and have always lived there, are not subject to taxation as residents of France.

 continues taxing its citizens who move from Italy to a tax haven as residents of Italy, unless they demonstrate that they no longer have any ties to Italy.

 continues taxing its citizens who move from Mexico to a tax haven as residents of Mexico, for the first three years after moving there. After this period, they are no longer considered residents of Mexico for tax purposes.

 taxes its citizens who move to a tax haven as residents of Portugal, for the first five years after moving there. After this period, they are no longer considered residents of Portugal for tax purposes.

 continues taxing its citizens who move from Spain to a tax haven as residents of Spain, for the first five years after moving there. After this period, they are no longer considered residents of Spain for tax purposes.

 continues taxing its citizens (as well as foreigners who lived there for at least ten years) who move from Sweden to another country as residents of Sweden, for the first five years after moving there, unless they demonstrate that they no longer have essential connections to Sweden. After this period, they are no longer considered residents of Sweden for tax purposes.

 taxes its citizens who are residing abroad to work for the Turkish government or Turkish companies as residents of Turkey, but exempts their income that is already taxed by the country of origin.

A few other countries used to tax the foreign income of nonresident citizens, but have abolished this practice:

 used to tax the worldwide income of its citizens regardless of where they resided, but abandoned this practice some time between 1933 and 1954.
 used to tax its citizens in the same manner as residents, on worldwide income. A new income tax law, passed in 1980 and effective 1981, determined only residence as the basis for taxation of worldwide income. However, since 2006 Mexico taxes based on citizenship in limited situations (see above).
 used to tax its citizens on worldwide income regardless of where they resided. A new income tax law, passed in 1997 and effective 1998, determined residence as the basis for taxation of worldwide income.
 used to tax the foreign income of nonresident citizens at reduced rates of 1 to 3% (income tax rates for residents were 1 to 35% at the time). It abolished this practice in a new revenue code in 1997, effective 1998.
 used to tax its citizens in the same manner as residents, on worldwide income. The country passed a personal income tax law in 2007, effective 2009, removing citizenship as a criterion to determine residence.

In Iran, Iraq, North Korea, the Philippines and Saudi Arabia, citizenship is relevant for the taxation of residents but not for nonresidents.

Other
There are some arrangements for international taxation that are not based on residency or citizenship:
 imposes global income tax on anyone who owes UK student loans. These are not true loans, but borrowings to be repaid through an additional 9% income tax, levied above a certain income threshold, until the balance of the loan expires in 30 years. The interest rate is expressed as a punitive addition to the UK Retail Price Index inflation rate (e.g. RPI + 3%), so the value of the loan cannot be inflated away. The loan cannot be repudiated by declaring bankruptcy. The income tax is imposed irrespective of citizenship or residency, which means the UK HMRC must track the location and income of all loan holders, wherever they are in the world, for several decades.

Corporations
Countries do not necessarily use the same system of taxation for individuals and corporations. For example, France uses a residence-based system for individuals but a territorial system for corporations, while Singapore does the opposite, and Brunei and Monaco taxes corporate but not personal income.

Exclusion
Many systems provide for specific exclusions from taxable (chargeable) income. For example, several countries, notably the United States, Cyprus, Luxembourg, Netherlands and Spain, have enacted holding company regimes that exclude from income dividends from certain foreign subsidiaries of corporations. These systems generally impose tax on other sorts of income, such as interest or royalties, from the same subsidiaries. They also typically have requirements for portion and time of ownership in order to qualify for exclusion. The United States excludes dividends received by U.S. corporations from non-U.S. subsidiaries, as well as 50% of the deemed remittance of aggregate income of non-U.S. subsidiaries in excess of an aggregate 10% return on tangible depreciable assets. The Netherlands offers a "participation exemption" for dividends from subsidiaries of Netherlands companies. Dividends from all Dutch subsidiaries automatically qualify. For other dividends to qualify, the Dutch shareholder or affiliates must own at least 5% and the subsidiary must be subject to a certain level of income tax locally.

Some countries, such as Singapore, allow deferment of tax on foreign income of resident corporations until it is remitted to the country.

Individuals versus enterprises
Many tax systems tax individuals in one manner and entities that are not considered fiscally transparent in another. The differences may be as simple as differences in tax rates, and are often motivated by concerns unique to either individuals or corporations. For example, many systems allow taxable income of an individual to be reduced by a fixed amount allowance for other persons supported by the individual (dependents). Such a concept is not relevant for enterprises.

Many systems allow for fiscal transparency of certain forms of enterprise. For example, most countries tax partners of a partnership, rather than the partnership itself, on income of the partnership.  A common feature of income taxation is imposition of a levy on certain enterprises in certain forms followed by an additional levy on owners of the enterprise upon distribution of such income. For example, the U.S. imposes two levels of tax on foreign individuals or foreign corporations who own a U.S. corporation. First, the U.S. corporation is subject to the regular income tax on its profits, then subject to an additional 30% tax on the dividends paid to foreign shareholders (the branch profits tax). The foreign corporation will be subject to U.S. income tax on its effectively connected income, and will also be subject to the branch profits tax on any of its profits not reinvested in the U.S. Thus, many countries tax corporations under company tax rules and tax individual shareholders upon corporate distributions. Various countries have tried (and some still maintain) attempts at partial or full "integration" of the enterprise and owner taxation. Where a two level system is present but allows for fiscal transparency of some entities, definitional issues become very important.

Source of income
Determining the source of income is of critical importance in a territorial system, as source often determines whether or not the income is taxed. For example, Hong Kong does not tax residents on dividend income received from a non-Hong Kong corporation. Source of income is also important in residency systems that grant credits for taxes of other jurisdictions. Such credit is often limited either by jurisdiction or to the local tax on overall income from other jurisdictions.

Source of income is where the income is considered to arise under the relevant tax system. The manner of determining the source of income is generally dependent on the nature of income. Income from the performance of services (e.g., wages) is generally treated as arising where the services are performed. Financing income (e.g., interest, dividends) is generally treated as arising where the user of the financing resides. Income related to use of tangible property (e.g., rents) is generally treated as arising where the property is situated. Income related to use of intangible property (e.g., royalties) is generally treated as arising where the property is used. Gains on sale of realty are generally treated as arising where the property is situated.

Gains from sale of tangible personal property are sourced differently in different jurisdictions. The U.S. treats such gains in three distinct manners: a) gain from sale of purchased inventory is sourced based on where title to the goods passes; b) gain from sale of inventory produced by the person (or certain related persons) is sourced 50% based on title passage and 50% based on location of production and certain assets; c) other gains are sourced based on the residence of the seller.

In specific cases, the tax system may diverge for different categories of individuals. U.S. citizen and resident alien decedents are subject to estate tax on all of their assets, wherever situated. The nonresident aliens are subject to estate tax only on that part of the gross estate which at the time of death is situated in the U.S. Another significant distinction between U.S. citizens/RAs and NRAs is in the exemptions allowed in computing the tax liability.

Where differing characterizations of an item of income can result in differing tax results, it is necessary to determine the characterization. Some systems have rules for resolving characterization issues, but in many cases resolution requires judicial intervention.  Note that some systems which allow a credit for foreign taxes source income by reference to foreign law.

Definitions of income
Some jurisdictions tax net income as determined under financial accounting concepts of that jurisdiction, with few, if any, modifications. Other jurisdictions determine taxable income without regard to income reported in financial statements. Some jurisdictions compute taxable income by reference to financial statement income with specific categories of adjustments, which can be significant.

A jurisdiction relying on financial statement income tends to place reliance on the judgment of local accountants for determinations of income under locally accepted accounting principles. Often such jurisdictions have a requirement that financial statements be audited by registered accountants who must opine thereon. Some jurisdictions extend the audit requirements to include opining on such tax issues as transfer pricing. Jurisdictions not relying on financial statement income must attempt to define principles of income and expense recognition, asset cost recovery, matching, and other concepts within the tax law. These definitional issues can become very complex. Some jurisdictions following this approach also require business taxpayers to provide a reconciliation of financial statement and taxable incomes.

Deductions

Systems that allow a tax deduction of expenses in computing taxable income must provide for rules for allocating such expenses between classes of income. Such classes may be taxable versus non-taxable, or may relate to computations of credits for taxes of other systems (foreign taxes). A system which does not provide such rules is subject to manipulation by potential taxpayers.  The manner of allocation of expenses varies. U.S. rules provide for allocation of an expense to a class of income if the expense directly relates to such class, and apportionment of an expense related to multiple classes. Specific rules are provided for certain categories of more fungible expenses, such as interest.  By their nature, rules for allocation and apportionment of expenses may become complex. They may incorporate cost accounting or branch accounting principles, or may define new principles.

Thin capitalization

Most jurisdictions provide that taxable income may be reduced by amounts expended as interest on loans. By contrast, most do not provide tax relief for distributions to owners. Thus, an enterprise is motivated to finance its subsidiary enterprises through loans rather than capital. Many jurisdictions have adopted "thin capitalization" rules to limit such charges. Various approaches include limiting deductibility of interest expense to a portion of cash flow, disallowing interest expense on debt in excess of a certain ratio, and other mechanisms.

Enterprise restructure
The organization or reorganization of portions of a multinational enterprise often gives rise to events that, absent rules to the contrary, may be taxable in a particular system. Most systems contain rules preventing recognition of income or loss from certain types of such events. In the simplest form, contribution of business assets to a subsidiary enterprise may, in certain circumstances, be treated as a nontaxable event. Rules on structuring and restructuring tend to be highly complex.

Credits for taxes of other jurisdictions

Systems that tax income from outside the system's jurisdiction tend to provide for a unilateral credit or offset for taxes paid to other jurisdictions. Such other jurisdiction taxes are generally referred to within the system as "foreign" taxes. Tax treaties  often require this credit.  A credit for foreign taxes is subject to manipulation by planners if there are no limits, or weak limits, on such credit. Generally, the credit is at least limited to the tax within the system that the taxpayer would pay on income from outside the jurisdiction. The credit may be limited by category of income, by other jurisdiction or country, based on an effective tax rate, or otherwise. Where the foreign tax credit is limited, such limitation may involve computation of taxable income from other jurisdictions. Such computations tend to rely heavily on the source of income and allocation of expense rules of the system.

Withholding tax

Many jurisdictions require persons paying amounts to nonresidents to collect tax due from a nonresident with respect to certain income by withholding such tax from such payments and remitting the tax to the government. Such levies are generally referred to as withholding taxes. These requirements are induced because of potential difficulties in collection of the tax from nonresidents. Withholding taxes are often imposed at rates differing from the prevailing income tax rates. Further, the rate of withholding may vary by type of income or type of recipient. Generally, withholding taxes are reduced or eliminated under income tax treaties (see below). Generally, withholding taxes are imposed on the gross amount of income, unreduced by expenses. Such taxation provides for great simplicity of administration but can also reduce the taxpayer's awareness of the amount of tax being collected.

Treaties

Tax treaties exist between many countries on a bilateral basis to prevent double taxation (taxes levied twice on the same income, profit, capital gain, inheritance or other item). In some countries they are also known as double taxation agreements, double tax treaties, or tax information exchange agreements (TIEA).

Most developed countries have a large number of tax treaties, while developing countries are less well represented in the worldwide tax treaty network. The United Kingdom has treaties with more than 110 countries and territories. The United States has treaties with 56 countries (as of February 2007). Tax treaties tend not to exist, or to be of limited application, when either party regards the other as a tax haven. There are a number of model tax treaties published by various national and international bodies, such as the United Nations and the OECD.

Treaties tend to provide reduced rates of taxation on dividends, interest, and royalties. They tend to impose limits on each treaty country in taxing business profits, permitting taxation only in the presence of a permanent establishment in the country. Treaties tend to impose limits on taxation of salaries and other income for performance of services. They also tend to have "tie breaker" clauses for resolving conflicts between residency rules. Nearly all treaties have at least skeletal mechanisms for resolving disputes, generally negotiated between the "competent authority" section of each country's taxing authority.

Anti-deferral measures
Residency systems may provide that residents are not subject to tax on income outside the jurisdiction until that income is remitted to the jurisdiction. Taxpayers in such systems have significant incentives to shift income outside its borders. Depending on the rules of the system, the shifting may occur by changing the location of activities generating income or by shifting income to separate enterprises owned by the taxpayer. Most residency systems have avoided rules which permit deferring income from outside its borders without shifting it to a subsidiary enterprise due to the potential for manipulation of such rules. Where owners of an enterprise are taxed separately from the enterprise, portable income may be shifted from a taxpayer to a subsidiary enterprise to accomplish deferral or elimination of tax. Such systems tend to have rules to limit such deferral through controlled foreign corporations. Several different approaches have been used by countries for their anti-deferral rules.

In the United States, rules provides that U.S. shareholders of a Controlled Foreign Corporation (CFC) must include their shares of income or investment of E&P by the CFC in U.S. property. U.S. shareholders are U.S. persons owning 10% or more (after the application of complex attribution of ownership rules) of a foreign corporation. Such persons may include individuals, corporations, partnerships, trusts, estates, and other juridical persons. A CFC is a foreign corporation more than 50% owned by U.S. shareholders. This income includes several categories of portable income, including most investment income, certain resale income, and certain services income. Certain exceptions apply, including the exclusion from Subpart F income of CFC income subject to an effective foreign tax rate of 90% or more of the top U.S. tax rate.

The United Kingdom provides that a UK company is taxed currently on the income of its controlled subsidiary companies managed and controlled outside the UK which are subject to "low" foreign taxes. Low tax is determined as actual tax of less than three-fourths of the corresponding UK tax that would be due on the income determined under UK principles. Complexities arise in computing the corresponding UK tax. Further, there are certain exceptions which may permit deferral, including a "white list" of permitted countries and a 90% earnings distribution policy of the controlled company. Further, anti-deferral does not apply where there is no tax avoidance motive.

Rules in Germany provide that a German individual or company shareholder of a foreign corporation may be subject to current German tax on certain passive income received by the foreign corporation. This provision applies if the foreign corporation is taxed at less than 25% of the passive income, as defined. Japan and some other countries have followed a "black list" approach, where income of subsidiaries in countries identified as tax havens is subject to current tax to the shareholder. Sweden has adopted a "white list" of countries in which subsidiaries may be organized so that the shareholder is not subject to current tax.

Transfer pricing

The setting of the amount of related party charges is commonly referred to as transfer pricing. Many jurisdictions have become sensitive to the potential for shifting profits with transfer pricing, and have adopted rules regulating setting or testing of prices or allowance of deductions or inclusion of income for related party transactions. Many jurisdictions have adopted broadly similar transfer pricing rules. The OECD has adopted (subject to specific country reservations) fairly comprehensive guidelines. These guidelines have been adopted with little modification by many countries. Notably, the U.S. and Canada have adopted rules which depart in some material respects from OECD guidelines, generally by providing more detailed rules.

Arm's length principle: It is a key concept of most transfer pricing rules, that prices charged between related enterprises should be those which would be charged between unrelated parties dealing at arm's length. Most sets of rules prescribe methods for testing whether prices charged should be considered to meet this standard. Such rules generally involve comparison of related party transactions to similar transactions of unrelated parties (comparable prices or transactions). Various surrogates for such transactions may be allowed. Most guidelines allow the following methods for testing prices: Comparable uncontrolled transaction prices, resale prices based on comparable markups, cost plus a markup, and an enterprise profitability method.

Tax avoidance 
Tax avoidance schemes may take advantage of low or no-income tax countries known as tax havens. Corporations may choose to move their headquarters to a country with more favorable tax environments. In countries where movement has been restricted by legislation, it might be necessary to reincorporate into a low-tax company through reversing a merger with a foreign corporation ("inversion" similar to a reverse merger). In addition, transfer pricing may allow for "earnings stripping" as profits are attributed to subsidiaries in low-tax countries.

For individuals tax avoidance has become a major issue for governments worldwide since the 2008 recession. These tax directives began when the United States introduced the Foreign Account Tax Compliance Act (FATCA) in 2010, and were greatly expanded by the work of The Organisation for Economic Co-operation and Development (OECD).  The OECD introduced a new international system for the automatic exchange of tax information – known as the Common Reporting Standard (CRS) – to which around 100 countries have committed. For some taxpayers, the CRS is already “live”; for others it is imminent. The goal of this worldwide exchange of tax information is tax transparency, and has aroused concerns about privacy and data breaches due to the sheer volume of information that is going to be exchanged.

Expanded Worldwide Planning (EWP) is an element of international taxation created in the wake of tax directives from government tax authorities after the worldwide recession beginning in 2008. At the heart of EWP is a properly constructed Private placement life insurance (PPLI) policy that allows taxpayers to use the regulatory framework of life insurance to structure their assets. These assets can be located anywhere in the world and at the same time can be brought into compliance with tax authorities worldwide.  EWP also brings asset protection and privacy benefits that are set forward in the six principals of EWP.

See also
 Public finance
 List of countries by tax rates
 Tax equalization
 Functional currency
 Tariff
 Minimum corporate tax rate

Notes

References

Further reading
 Malherbe, Philippe, Elements of International Income Taxation, Bruylant (2015)
 Thuronyi, Victor, Kim Brooks, and Borbala Kolozs, Comparative Tax Law, Wolters Kluwer Publishers (2d ed. 2016)
 Lymer, Andrew and Hasseldine, John, eds., The International Taxation System, Kluwer Academic Publishers (2002)
 Kuntz, Joel D. and Peroni, Robert J.; U.S. International Taxation
 The International Bureau of Fiscal Documentation offers subscription services detailing taxation systems of most countries, as well as comprehensive tax treaties, in multiple languages. Also available and searchable by subscription through Thomson subsidiaries.
 CCH offers shorter descriptions for fewer countries (at a lower fee) as well as certain computational tools.
 At least six international accounting firms (BDO, Deloitte, Ernst & Young, Grant Thornton, KPMG, and PriceWaterhouseCoopers) and several law firms have individual country and multi-country guides available, often to non-clients. See the in-country web sites for each for contact information

External links
 Hong Kong IRD
 India Income Tax Department
 UK HM Revenue & Customs (formerly Inland Revenue)
 UK International Manual (non-technical guidance)
 U.S. law by code section
 U.S. regs
 USTC post-94 decisions
 USSC cases 1937-1975
 OECD - Centre for Tax Policy and Administration
 United Nations Taxation Committee

 
International taxation